Kampong Lumapas is a village in Brunei-Muara District, Brunei, located in the southern outskirts of the capital Bandar Seri Begawan . The population was 2,709 in 2016. It is one of the villages within Mukim Lumapas.

Facilities 

 Lumapas Primary School is the village primary school, whereas Lumapas Religious School is the village school for the country's Islamic religious primary education.
 The village mosque is Kampong Lumapas Mosque. The construction was completed in 1995; it can accommodate 700 worshippers.
 Bukit Saeh Recreational Park is a recreational park near Saeh Hill.

References 

Lumapas